Mercè Rodoreda i Gurguí (10 October 1908 – 13 April 1983) was a Spanish novelist, who wrote in Catalan.

She is considered the most influential contemporary Catalan language writer, as evidenced by the references of other authors in her work and the international repercussion, with translations into more than thirty languages.

She also has been called the most important Catalan female novelist of the postwar period. Her novel La plaça del diamant ('The diamond square', translated as The Time of the Doves, 1962) has become the most popular Catalan novel to date and has been translated into over 30 languages. Some critics consider it to be one of the best novels published in Spain after the Spanish Civil War.

After her death, one more of her artistic aspects was discovered, painting, which had remained in the background due to the importance that Rodoreda gave to writing:

Biography

Childhood (1908-1921)
Mercè Rosa Rodoreda i Gurguí was born on October 10, 1908, at 340 carrer de Balmes, Barcelona Her parents were Andreu Rodoreda, from Terrassa and Montserrat Gurguí, from Maresme. Both were lovers of literature and theater and had attended recital classes taught by Adrià Gual at the School of Dramatic Art (which would later become the Institute of Theater). Her mother also had an interest in music.

Her parents' financial problems forced her to leave school at age nine, from 1915 to 1917 at the Lurdes School in the Sarrià neighborhood and from 1917 to 1920 at the Nuestra Señora de Lourdes center, which was closest to her home, on Calle de Padua, at the height of the street of Vallirana. Later she went to an academy where she studied only French and business arithmetic.

Her maternal grandfather, Pere Gurguí, was an admirer of Jacint Verdaguer (of whom he had been a friend) and had collaborated as an editor in the magazines La Renaixensa and L'Arc de Sant Martí. In 1910, Pere Gurguí had a monument in memory of Jacint Verdaguer erected in the garden of his house that bore an engraving with the title of the two most important works of the author, Canigó and L'Atlàntida; that place became the space for parties and family gatherings. The figure of her grandfather marked her intensely and she came to consider him her teacher. Gurguí instilled in her a deep Catalan feeling, and a love for the Catalan language and flowers that were well reflected throughout Mercè Rodoreda's work.

On May 18, 1913, when she was only five years old, she performed for the first time in a play playing the role of the girl Kitty in The Mysterious Jimmy Samson, at the Torrent de les Flors theater. Years later, this character was, in a certain way, recovered for the story The bathroom, within the work Twenty-two stories.

During her childhood she read all the classic and modern Catalan authors, such as Jacint Verdaguer, Ramon Llull, Joan Maragall, Josep Maria de Sagarra and Josep Carner, among others, surely influenced by the bohemian atmosphere that was breathed in her family's home.

On May 30, 1920, she participated in the drama Fifteen Days of Reign at Lourdes School. In the same act she also read the poem in Catalan called La negra.

In 1921, her uncle Juan moved in with the family and changed the lifestyle of all its members, imposing austerity and conventional order. She had idealized him as a result of the letters she had previously received and ended up marrying him on October 10, 1928, her twentieth birthday, in the church of Bonanova. He was fourteen years older than her and, due to the degree of consanguinity, they needed a papal dispensation.

Youth (1921-1938)
After the wedding, the couple went to Paris on a honeymoon, and then they settled in a house on Zaragoza Street. Her husband had gone to Argentina when he was very young and had returned with a small fortune.

On July 23, 1929, their only son, Jordi Gurguí i Rodoreda, was born. From that moment on, Mercè Rodoreda began to do literary tests, to get rid of the economic and social dependency that the monotonous married life gave her. That is how she began to consider writing as a profession. Every day she locked herself for a while in a blue dovecote that was in Manuel Angelon's maternal house, which possibly later served as an inspiration to include the dovecote in The Time of the Doves. During that time, she wrote verses, a theatrical comedy (which remains defunct), and a novel. Meanwhile, the Second Republic was proclaimed.

Second Spanish Republic
In 1931 she began to take classes at the Dalmau Lyceum, where she improved her knowledge of language under the guidance of the pedagogue, linguist and esperantist Delfí Dalmau i Enero, who greatly influenced her and encouraged her to train, and with whom a bond of friendship developed. Rodoreda showed Dalmau what she wrote and he encouraged her to make these first texts public. According to Dalmau, Mercè Rodoreda was an exceptional student, possessing spiritual fulfillment and a promising literary soul. This admiration led Dalmau to ask her to be one of the counterparts in her work Polémica, An Apology for Catalan and Esperanto; she answered affirmatively and the piece was published in 1934. As the teacher Dalmau recognized, this work had also been influenced by Rodoreda's observations.

In 1932, the first novel by Mercè Rodoreda entitled Am I an honored woman? and also some stories for various newspapers. The work went almost unnoticed until it was nominated for the Crexells Prize in 1933, although the winner of that year was Carles Soldevila. Also in that year of 1932, on October 20, she published an interview with the actress Maria Vila in the Mirador magazine.

On October 1, 1933, she began her journalistic career in the weekly magazine Clarisme where she published twenty-two contributions: five prose on traditional culture, thirteen interviews, two reviews, a short story, and three comments on political, musical and film themes. That same year, she joined the Barcelona Press Association, which evidenced her intention to formalize collaboration with journalistic work.

In the spring of 1934 she published her second work, What cannot be escaped, in the editions of the magazine Clarisme. In May of that same year, she won the Independent Casino Award of the Floral Games of Lleida with the story "The little mermaid and the dolphin", which is currently lost.

After writing that second work, Joan Puig i Ferrater, director of Ediciones Proa, visited her and was interested in publishing her next work: A day in the life of a man, which was published in the autumn of that same year in Proa. Rodoreda began to enter the literary world thanks to the help of Puig i Ferrater himself, who opened the doors of El Club de los Novelistas, made up of authors such as Armand Obiols, Francesc Trabal or Joan Oliver, who were also former members of The Sabadell Group. At that time, she began to read the novels of Fyodor Dostoevsky.

From 1935 to 1939, she published a total of sixteen stories for children in the newspaper La Publicidad, in a section called A while with children. Noteworthy is The Boy and The House, dedicated to her son, and also The Sheet, which she dedicated to Josep Carner. In addition, she combined it with the publication of stories in the leading Catalan press media such as La Revista, La Veu de Catalunya and Mirador, among others.

In 1936 she published her fourth novel, Crim. Later, Rodoreda rejected this novel, along with the previous three, considering them the product of inexperience.

Spanish Civil War
From 1937 until that moment, Rodoreda held the position of Catalan language corrector in the Generalitat's Propaganda Commissariat. In this place she met writers of that time such as Aurora Bertrana, Maria Teresa Vernet, and also established a friendship with Susina Amat, Julieta Franquesa, Anna Murià and Carmen Manrubia.

She was awarded the 1937 Joan Crexells Prize for her work Aloma. That same year, she separated from her husband Joan Gurguí, after nine years of marriage and with one child. Her alleged lover, Andreu Nin, was arrested on June 16 in front of his party's headquarters on La Rambla in Barcelona, where days later he was tortured and killed by Soviet police officers on the orders of General Alexander Orlov, in the prison of Alcalá de Henares.

In 1938, the fifth novel by Mercè Rodoreda entitled Aloma was published by the Institution of Catalan Letters. This was the first work that Rodoreda accepted as hers, although later she rewrote and published it again. The same year, on behalf of the PEN Club of Catalonia, she traveled together with the Catalan writer Francesc Trabal, and read a welcome written by Carles Riba at the international congress of the PEN club in Prague.

Exile (1938-1972)
On January 23, 1939, a few months before the defeat of the Republicans, she fled into exile. Thinking that the separation would be brief, she left her son with her mother. Although she had never participated in politics, she left on the advice of her mother, who feared problems due to collaborative activities with Catalan publications and some left-wing magazines in previous years. Along with other intellectuals of the time, she went from Barcelona to Gerona with a bookmobile owned by the Ministry of Culture of the Generalitat of Catalonia, then she followed the path through Mas Perxés, in the municipality of Agullana, until crossing the administrative border by Le Perthus and entered Northern Catalonia on January 30. After spending the night in Le Boulou, they went to Perpignan; where they spent three days and then traveled to Toulouse by train.

Roissy-en-Brie
She arrived in the French capital at the end of February and in early April she moved to Roissy-en-Brie, a town near the east of the capital. She settled in the castle of Roissy-en-Brie, an 18th-century building, which was offered as a refuge for writers. She shared a home for a few months with other intellectuals such as Anna Murià, César Augusto Jordana, Armand Obiols, Francesc Trabal and Carles Riba.

In Roissy-en-Brie several love affairs arose; one of them was between Mercè Rodoreda and Armand Obiols. The problems in the castle arose because Armand Obiols was married to Francesc Trabal's sister and they had a son, who had remained in Barcelona with his mother. Furthermore, Armand Obiols' mother-in-law had traveled with Trabal to Roissy-en-Brie along with other members of the Trabal family. Consequently, this affair divided the Catalan exiles into two opposing camps. According to Anna Murià, Francesc Trabal was opposed not only by his sister but by jealousy, since he would have had a secret relationship with Mercè Rodoreda in Barcelona that only the two of them and their confidante knew. Rodoreda wanted to write a book about it called The Roissy novel, however, she never decided to do it.

The atmosphere of stability offered by the castle was disturbed by the start of World War II. At that time, some decided to flee to Latin American countries and others preferred to stay in France; this last destination was the one chosen by Rodoreda and Obiols. Later they moved to the Villa Rosset house, on the outskirts of the city.

Escaping from the Nazi troops

Mercè Rodoreda, along with other writers who were still taking refuge in France, had to flee from Paris in mid-June 1940 due to the advance of the Germans army going in the direction of Orléans by way of Artenay. Josep Maria Esverd was able to get a truck to flee France; however, the next day the truck was requisitioned by French troops. After an unsuccessful attempt to catch a train, they had to flee south on foot. The objective was to cross the Loire River in order to enter the unoccupied area, but shortly before reaching Orleans it was found on fire and there was no bridge left on that stretch of the Loire River; consequently, they deviated from the fixed route.

For twelve days they were sheltered in a farm until the signing of the armistice of 22 June 1940, after they crossed the Loire River through the town of Meung-sur-Loire, which was completely destroyed. From there they traveled even further south, this time settling in Limoges.

Limoges-Bordeaux
In Limoges, she settled in a room at 12 Hijas-Notre-Dame street. These were difficult times for Rodoreda, because on June 5, 1941, her partner Armand Obiols was arrested, and she was left alone until October of that year. During that time Armand Obiols had to do forced labor in Saillat-sur-Vienne in a quarry. However, several efforts by Rodoreda got him to be sent to Bordeaux. When Obiols was already in better living conditions in Bordeaux, Rodoreda became involved in a study circle dedicated to reading and learning the English language.

During the following months, the relationship between Mercè Rodoreda and Armand Obiols was mostly at a distance, and only sporadically could they see each other in person. It was not until the end of August 1943 that Rodoreda moved to number 43 Chauffours street in Bordeaux where she was reunited with her lover. In Bordeaux she lived very hard times and, in her words, she sewed "until dirty" in a warehouse for much of the day, a job that did not leave her time to write.

Paris
The return to Paris took place in September 1946 when Rodoreda and Obiols moved to the house of Rafael Tasis in exile, the house was located at number 9  Coëtlogon street. A short time later, the couple moved to the sixth floor of number 21 on Cherche-Midi street, in the residential area of Saint-Germain-des-Prés, which was a meeting place for many intellectuals of the time. This was her home for eight years and, in fact, she did not fully disengage until 1977.

At the beginning of 1947, she was able to leave her job as a seamstress to go back to work as a collaborator in the magazine Revista de Catalunya. Apart from publishing narrations during that year in the various editions of the magazine, she was also able to publish some in Chile and Mexico.

From 1947 to 1953, Mercè Rodoreda was unable to cultivate extensive literature because just in 1945 she had begun to suffer from health problems, along with the reappearance of somatic paralysis in her right arm. For this reason, she intensified her poetic creation and found her teacher in Josep Carner, with whom she maintained a close relationship by correspondence. In 1952, she began recovery therapy at the Châtel-Guyon spa. During the years that she was in Paris, she also began two novels that she did not finish.

In 1947, during the Floral Games of the Catalan Language held in London, she won her first Natural Flower with six sonnets: Rosa, Amor novell, Adam a Eva, Ocell and two more untitled sonnets. With the poem Món d'Ulisses, Rodoreda won for the second time the Natural Flower of the Floral Games of 1948 in Paris, a poem that was published in the magazine La Nostra Revista that same year. Albes i nits gave her the third victory in the Floral Games contest and, consequently, she was named "Mestre en Gai Saber" in Montevideo in 1949. That same year she visited Barcelona for the first time after exile.

In 1951, she also approached painting, interested above all in painters such as Pablo Picasso, Paul Klee and Joan Miró, and she made some of her own creations. In a 1954 letter to Armand Oriols she explains that she already had a "style and a world" in painting, yet she acknowledged that her place was in writing. On the other hand, Obiols, began to work as a translator for UNESCO thanks to Quiroga Plá, and two years later, in 1953, he permanently moved to Geneva.

Geneva
In 1954, Rodoreda and Obiols moved into an apartment at 19 Violet street, in a bourgeois neighborhood in the city of Geneva. In this city, she always felt exiled and even recognized that Geneva "is a very boring city, suitable for writing". Shortly after, Obiols had to move to Vienna for work reasons. That same year, Rodoreda made a trip to Barcelona to attend the wedding of her son, Jordi Gurguí i Rodoreda.

In 1956, she won the Joan Maragall Essay Prize with Three Sonnets and a Song that was published in the literary supplement La Gaceta de Letras de La Nova Revista (1955-1958). Likewise, for her story Carnaval she was awarded the Joan Santamaria Prize in Barcelona that same year.

In 1958 the book of short stories written under the name of Twenty-two short stories was published which, a year earlier, had received the prestigious Victor Català Prize. Some of these stories had already been published in Mexico during her exile in France, while others were unpublished. As the author confessed, this book came from a technical crisis that led to an unequal literary level among the various stories, although they were tied by a thematic unit.

According to some unpublished annotations that spoke of Geneva, Rodoreda revealed that during those years she saw writers such as Eugeni Xammar, Julio Cortázar and his wife, and Jorge Semprún.

During her long stay in Geneva, she created a garden that she would later replicate in Romanyà de la Selva. The many flowers that surrounded her served as inspiration to portray the flowers that would end up making up Real Flowers within Viatges i Flors, along with the trips that she would write in Romanyà; however, this book was not published until 1980.

La Perla del Lago was the title of a potential novel by the author that remained incomplete, and was kept in the archives of the Institute of Catalan Studies. The title is the name of a restaurant on the shore of Lake Geneva in a corner of Geneva that she frequented. It was a location near the United Nations building where the author regularly ate, and from where she had a great view in the dining room on the upper floors. As described in the prologue of Broken Mirror, the eyes of the protagonist Teresa Goday de Valldaura were the same as the lady of Lemán.

In 1958, she submitted Una mica d'història (A bit of history) for the Joanot Martorell Prize, although she did not win but Ricard Salvat did with "Animals destroying laws"; however, this novel was published in 1967 this time under the title Garden by the Sea. She also wrote the short story Ron Negrita for the volume "The 7 Deadly Sins Seen by 21 Storytellers", although it would later become part of the volume "It looked like silk and other stories". From 1958 onwards, and without breaking up with Rodoreda, Obiols maintained a relationship with a woman in Geneva until his death.

In 1959, Rodoreda began to write the novel that was possibly the best of her career The Time of the Doves (Colometa), published in 1962 as La plaça del Diamant for El Club de los Novelistas. In 1960, she submitted the novel to the Premi Sant Jordi de novel·la, previously known as the Joanot Martorell Prize, however, she did not win but the Enric Massó y Urgellès prize was won with her novel Vivir es no facil (Living is not easy). Joan Fuster also sent her to 'The Novelists Club', which at that time was run by Joan Sales. Sales was delighted by the novel and started a correspondence with Rodoreda. From that moment, she found in the Editor Club a space where she could pour her literary work, where Salas was a co-founder. When it was published in 1962, the novel was not exactly the one that had been presented for the Sant Jordi prize, but it had received an extension both in chapters and in corrections by Salas, Obiols and the author herself.

In 1961, she sent another work to the same award, Death in Spring, which did not win either, but rather it was Josep Maria Espinàs with The Last Landing who was victorious.

In 1965, Rodoreda took the first steps in the publication of her Complete Works after a request from Joaquim Molas, however they would not be published in Ediciones 62 until 1977. The work did not include any of her first four works (I am an honest woman?, What cannot escape, A day in the life of a man and Crime) because she considered that they were the result of her inexperience and she agreed to rewrite Aloma to adapt it to the level of her current work; and that it would be reissued in 1969.

In 1966, her mother, Montserrat Gurguí, died; and three years later her uncle-husband, Joan Gurguí. As a result of the death of her husband, the relationship between mother and son was strained due to problems with the distribution of the inheritance. However, in 1966 was the year in which La calle de las Camelias was published that received the Sant Jordi Prize without her having submitted a candidacy; This fact was used for the direction to decide to award a work already published. With this same novel she also received the Serra d'Or Critical Prize for Literature and Essay in 1967, and the Ramon Llull Novel Award in 1969. In 1967, she began working on the novel Broken Mirror, which years later would become one of the most successful works of the author. Broken mirror was the result of the reworking of the play A day that had not been able to premiere. She also published two works: Garden by the Sea and a collection of stories entitled My Cristina and other stories.

From 1970 onwards, her work began to be translated into other languages, though her first translated work was La Plaza del Diamante in Spanish in 1965. In 1971, her feeling of exile was accentuated with the death of her companion of many years, Armand Obiols, at the Vienna University Hospital. This fact, together with the discovery of another Obiols lover, left her even more alone and broken in Switzerland. During those days, she wrote a shocking little card about the hard days she spent in the hospital; currently, this card is kept in the archives of the IEC. Consequently, after the reunion with some friends from the time of the Civil War, she decided to settle in 1972 in Carmen Manrubia's chalet in Romanyà de la Selva, without ceasing to reside in Geneva, albeit more and more sporadically.

Romanyà de la Selva (1972-1983)

In 1972, she spent the summer in La Senyal - currently called La Senyal Vell - in Romanyà de la Selva, which was a house owned by her friend Carmen Manrubia, however it had been designed by both of them. Her friendship with Carmen Manrubia existed since when they worked together in the Propaganda Commissariat of the Generalitat of Catalonia during the Spanish Civil War, although they became estranged when Manrubio and Rodoreda went into exile in different countries. Also participating in this project were Carmen Manrubia's adopted son, Carlos, Susina Amat and Esther Floricourt. She lived in this house for six years, until in 1979 she built her own house in Romanyà. The name chosen by the two friends for the house, La senyal, refers to the stigma of Cain in the work Demian by Hermann Hesse.

At Manrubio's house she substantially completed the writing work for Broken Mirror that had already begun in Geneva years before. This work is considered the most successful of her literary production and was published in 1974. She also wrote there Trips to various towns within Trips and flowers and the novel War, So Much War These two books were published in 1980 and with these she won the City of Barcelona Award. That same year, he also went to Barcelona to make the proclamation of the Fiestas de la Mercè. Also in that same year, she was awarded the Catalan Literary Lifetime Achievement Award for her literary career in the Catalan language, thus achieving her consecration as a writer. In 1978, Semblava de seda i altres contes ("It looked like silk and other stories") was published, which was a compilation of stories written throughout her life.

The joint project between Mercè Rodoreda and Manrubio failed. Mercè Rodoreda bought a piece of land in 1977 in which she had a house built next to the existing one; which would be finished in 1979. According to Anna Maria Saludes and Amat, this abandonment of the Manrubio house was given by Rodoreda's need to follow a life in solitude typical of her character; fruit of the difficult coexistence between the two.

In 1979, she wrote her theatrical comedy El Maniquí, which was premiered in the same year by the Brujas de Dol company at the Sitges International Theater Festival directed by Aracelli Bruch.

In those last years of her life, Mercè Rodoreda saw her novels several times on the small and big screen. First, her novel Aloma, directed by Lluís Pascual, made the leap to television in 1978. Later, made the leap to the big screen La plaça del Diamant (1982) with Silvia Munt in the role of Colometa and directed by Francesc Betriu.

In 1982, she wrote a compilation of biographical articles published in Serra d'Or titled Childhood Files. Mercè Rodoreda belonged to the Catalan Language Writers Association and was a member and honorary member after her return.

During the last period of her life, her works developed from her usual psychologic style to become more akin to symbolism in its more cryptic form.

In 1998, a literature prize was instituted in her name: the Mercè Rodoreda prize for short stories and narratives.

She was made a Member of Honour of the Associació d'Escriptors en Llengua Catalana,  the Association of Writers in Catalan Language. The library in Platja d'Aro is named in her honor.

Death

At 1:30 p.m. on April 13, 1983, Mercè Rodoreda died of very advanced liver cancer at the Muñoz Clinic (now defunct), in the city of Girona. During her last days, when she was already admitted to the Girona hospital, Mercè Rodoreda reconciled with the members of her family after they were notified by Joan Sales. As explained by Rodoreda's close friend, Isabel Parés, when Rodoreda was diagnosed with cancer, she collapsed and did not want to fight to live.

The burning chapel was installed in the Palau Solterra of the Department of Culture of the Generalitat and, following her wishes, Rodoreda was buried in the Romanyà de la Selva cemetery in a massive burial attended by many of her colleagues and colleagues. other personalities of the moment. Her intellectual legacy was inherited from the Institute for Catalan Studies, which years later created the Mercè Rodoreda Foundation.

Selected bibliography

Original editions

Novels
 1932, Soc una  dona honrada? ("Am I an Honest Woman?") (Barcelona: Llibreria Catalòna).
 1934, Del que hom no pot fugir ("What one Cannot Flee") (Barcelona: Clarisme).
 1934, Un dia de la vida d'un home ("One Day in the Life of a Man") (Barcelona: Biblioteca a Tot Vent 70).
 1936, Crim ("Murder") (Barcelona: Edicions de la Rosa dels Vents).
 1938, Aloma (Barcelona: Institució de les Lletres Catalanes), revised in 1969 (Barcelona: Edicions 62).
 1962, La plaça del diamant ("Diamond Square") (Barcelona: Club Editor).
 1966, El carrer de les Camèlies ("The Street of the Camellias") (Barcelona: Club Editor).
 1967, Jardí vora el mar ("Garden by the Sea") (Barcelona: Club Editor).
 1974, Mirall Trencat ("Broken Mirror") (Barcelona: Club Editor).
 1980, Quanta, quanta guerra '...' ("So Much War …") (Barcelona: Club Editor).
 1986 (posth.), La mort i la primavera ed. Nuria Folch ("Death in Spring") (Barcelona: Club Editor).
 1997 (posth.), La mort i la primavera ed. Carme Arnau (Barcelona: Institut d'Estudis Catalan).
 1991 (posth.), Isabel i Maria ("Isabel and Maria") ed. Carme Arnau) (Valencia: Ediciona 3 i 4).

Short story collections
 1958, Vint-i-dos contes ("Twenty Two Stories") (Barcelona: Editorial Selecta).
 1967, La meva Cristina i altres contes ("My Christina and Other Stories") (Barcelona: Edins 62).
 1979, Semblava de seda i altres contes ("It Seemed Like Silk and Other Stories") (Barcelona: Edicions 62).
 1980, Viatges i flors ("Travels and Flowers") (Barcelona: Edicions 62).

Complete works
 1984, Obres completes (Barcelona: Edicions 62) .

Bibliography
 Mendos, Maria Isidra, Mercè Rodoreda: A Selected and Annotated Bibliography (1963-2001) (Lanham, Maryland:  Scarecrow Press, 2004) .

English translations
 1981, The Time of the Doves (Plaça del diamant) trans. David H. Rosenthal (New York: Taplinger) .
 1984, My Christina & Other Stories trans. David H. Rosenthal (Port Townsend, Washington: Graywolf Press) .
 1993, Camellia Street (El carrer de les Camèlies) trans. David H. Rosenthal (Saint Paul, Minnesota: Graywolf Press, 1993) .
 2006, A Broken Mirror (Mirall trencat) trans. Josep Miquel Sobrer (Lincoln, Nebraska: Bison Books) .
 2009, Death in Spring (La mort i la primavera) trans. Martha Tennent (Rochester, New York: Open Letter .
 2011, The Selected Stories of Mercè Rodoreda, trans. Martha Tennent (Rochester, New York: Open Letter) . (Selected from Vint-i-dos contes and La miva Cristina i alters contes).
 2013, In Diamond Square (La plaça del diamant) trans. Peter Bush (London : Virago) .
 2015, War, So Much War (Quanta, quanta guerra …) trans. Martha Tennent and Maruxa Relaño (Rochester, New York: Open Letter) .
 2020, Garden By the Sea (Jardi vora el mar) trans. Martha Tennent and Maruxa Relaño (Rochester, New York: Open Letter) .

See also
 Òmnium Cultural References

External links
 
 
 Mirror Play: Virtual Exhibition on Mercè Rodoreda
 Biography and reviews at escriptors.com
 Mercè Rodoreda at Open Letter Books
 Nation A Domestic Existentialist: On Mercè Rodoreda  by The Nation''

1908 births
1983 deaths
Writers from Barcelona
War writers
Women writers from Catalonia
Novelists from Catalonia
Catalan-language writers
Premi d'Honor de les Lletres Catalanes winners
Deaths from cancer in Spain
Deaths from liver cancer
Spanish women writers
20th-century Spanish novelists
20th-century Spanish women